Mrinal Jha is an Indian writer, screenwriter and producer, who works in Hindi films and Television. She has written for popular TV shows such as Kaahin Kissii Roz, Banoo Main Teri Dulhann, Maayka, Agle Janam Mohe Bitiya Na Kijo, Qubool Hai, Divya Drishti, Naagin, Ishqbaaaz,Yehh Jadu Hai Jinn Ka!.

Mrinal Jha won Gold Award for Best Writer (story) in 2008 for the TV serial, Maayka. She is the winner of 2019 Indian Television Academy (ITA) Awards Best Story for the Sony TV's Tara From Satara. Her recent venture is Pishachini.

Personal life 
She is married to Abhigyan Jha and has a daughter. She has three dogs.

Career 
Mrinal has been a scriptwriter and creative producer for several TV channels some of which include Zee TV, Balaji Telefilms, Doordarshan, Star Plus, UTV. She along with Abhigyan Jha produced, Kaali - Ek Agnipariksha in 2010. She was also the producer of Jay Hind! a standup comedy show for the Internet platform.

Mrinal has written scripts for TV serials like Kaahin Kissii Roz, Kya Haadsa Kya Haqeeqat, Tum Bin Jaaoon Kahaan, Banoo Main Teri Dulhan, Amber Dhara, Chhoona Hai Aasmaan, Kyunki Saas Bhi Kabhi Bahu Thi, Santaan, Kasturi,  Kaali- Ek Agnipariksha, Sanjog Se Bani Sangini, Nazar and Pyaar Ka Bandhan. She has also penned for Mano Ya Na Mano, Meher, Yehh Jadu Hai Jinn Ka!, Tara From Satara.

She is also the co-founder of Undercover Utopia. Mrinal also won the Best Writer - Story award in 2008 at the Gold Awards function held in Dubai, for the TV series, Maayka.

Published works 
She debuted as a novelist with November Rain in 1994. Her novel, November Rain was transformed into a prime time TV series Tum Bin Jaaoon Kahaan, which was televised on Zee TV for over 300 episodes. Mrinal Jha has written four novels; November Rain, The Prayer, Soul Search Engine and Class MMX.

Filmography

Television

Web series

Awards and nominations

References

External links
 
 

Living people
Indian screenwriters
Indian writers
Indian film producers
Indian women writers
Indian non-fiction writers
Year of birth missing (living people)